Norman Paul Swanson (October 4, 1930 – November 24, 2016) was an American professional basketball player. Swanson was selected in the 1953 NBA Draft by the Rochester Royals after a collegiate career at Detroit. He played for one season and averaged 1.6 points, 1.7 rebounds and 0.5 assists per game.

References

1930 births
2016 deaths
American men's basketball players
Detroit Mercy Titans men's basketball players
Rochester Royals draft picks
Rochester Royals players
Small forwards
Carl Schurz High School alumni
Basketball players from Chicago